, born , was a Japanese novelist. He is best known around the world for his novels Kokoro, Botchan, I Am a Cat, Kusamakura and his unfinished work Light and Darkness. He was also a scholar of British literature and writer of haiku, kanshi, and fairy tales. From 1984 until 2004, his portrait appeared on the front of the Japanese 1,000 yen note.

Early years
Natsume Kin'nosuke was born on 9 February 1867 in the town of Babashita, Ushigome, Edo (present Kikui, Shinjuku, Tokyo), the fifth son of village head (nanushi) Natsume Kohē Naokatsu and his wife Chie. His father, a powerful and wealthy nanushi, owned all land from Ushigome to Takadanobaba in Edo and handled most civil lawsuits at his doorstep. He was a descendant of Natsume Yoshinobu, a Sengoku period samurai and retainer of Tokugawa Ieyasu. Sōseki began his life as an unwanted child, born to his mother late in her life, forty years old and his father then fifty-three. When he was born, he already had five siblings. Having five children and a toddler had created family insecurity and was in some ways a disgrace to the Natsume family. A childless couple, Shiobara Masanosuke and his wife, adopted him in 1868 and raised him until the age of nine, when the couple divorced. He returned to his biological family and was welcomed by his mother although regarded as a nuisance by his father. His mother died when he was fourteen, and his two eldest brothers died in 1887, intensifying his sense of insecurity.

Sōseki attended the First Tokyo Middle School (now Hibiya High School), where he became deeply enamored with Chinese literature, and fancied that he might someday become a writer. His desire to become an author arose when he was about fifteen when he told his older brother about his interest in literature. However, his family disapproved strongly of this course of action, and when Sōseki entered the Tokyo Imperial University in September 1884, it was with the intention of becoming an architect. Although he preferred Chinese classics, he started studying English at that time, feeling that it might prove useful to him in his future career, as English was a necessity in Japanese college.

In 1887, Sōseki met Masaoka Shiki, a friend who would give him encouragement on the path to becoming a writer, which would ultimately be his career. Shiki tutored him in the art of composing haiku. From this point on, he began signing his poems with the epithet Sōseki, a Chinese idiom meaning "stubborn". In 1890, he entered the English Literature department, and quickly mastered the English language. In 1891 he produced a partial English translation of the classical work Hōjōki upon request by his then English literature professor James Main Dixon. Sōseki graduated in 1893, and enrolled for some time as a graduate student and part-time teacher at the Tokyo Normal School.

In 1895, Sōseki began teaching at Matsuyama Middle School in Shikoku, which later became the setting of his novel Botchan. Along with fulfilling his teaching duties, Sōseki published haiku and Chinese poetry in a number of newspapers and periodicals. He resigned his post in 1896, and began teaching at the Fifth High School in Kumamoto. On June 10 of that year, he married Nakane Kyōko.

In the United Kingdom, 1901–1903

In 1900, the Japanese government sent Sōseki to study in Great Britain as "Japan's first Japanese English literary scholar". He visited Cambridge and stayed a night there, but gave up the idea of studying at the university because he could not afford it on his government scholarship. He studied instead at University College London (UCL). He had a miserable time in London, spending most of his days indoors buried in books, and his friends feared that he might be losing his mind. He also visited Pitlochry in Scotland, where he lodged with John Henry Dixon at the Dundarach Hotel.

He lived in four different lodgings: 76 Gower Street, near the British Museum; 85 Priory Road, West Hampstead; 6 Flodden Road, Camberwell; and 81 The Chase, Clapham (see the photograph). Only the last of these addresses, where he lodged with Priscilla Leale and her sister Elizabeth, proved satisfactory. Five years later, in his preface to Bungakuron (The Criticism of Literature), he wrote about the period:

He got along well with Priscilla, who shared his love of literature, notably Shakespeare and Milton (his tutor at UCL was the Shakespeare scholar W. J. Craig), and who also spoke fluent French, much to his admiration. The Leales were a Channel Island family, and Priscilla had been born in France. The sisters worried about Sōseki's incipient paranoia and successfully urged him to get out more and take up cycling.

Despite his poverty, loneliness, and mental torment, he consolidated his knowledge of English literature during this period and returned to the Empire of Japan in January 1903. In April he was appointed to the First National College in Tokyo. Also, he was given the lectureship in English literature, subsequently replacing Koizumi Yakumo (Lafcadio Hearn) and ultimately becoming a professor of English literature at the Tokyo Imperial University, where he taught literary theory and literary criticism.

Literary career

Sōseki's literary career began in 1903, when he began to contribute haiku, renku (haiku-style linked verse), haitaishi (linked verse on a set theme) and literary sketches to literary magazines, such as the prominent Hototogisu, edited by his former mentor Masaoka Shiki, and later by Takahama Kyoshi. However, it was the public success of his satirical novel I Am a Cat in 1905 that won him wide public admiration as well as critical acclaim.

He followed on this success with short stories, such as "Rondon tō" ("Tower of London") in 1905 and the novels Botchan ("Little Master"), and Kusamakura ("Grass Pillow") in 1906, which established his reputation, and which enabled him to leave his post at the university for a position with Asahi Shimbun in 1907, and to begin writing full-time. Much of his work deals with the relation between Japanese culture and Western culture. His early works in particular are influenced by his studies in London; his novel Kairo-kō was the earliest and only major prose treatment of the Arthurian legend in Japanese. He began writing one novel a year before his death from a stomach ulcer in 1916. After his death, his brain and stomach were donated to the University of Tokyo, and his brain has been preserved as a specimen there.

Major themes in Sōseki's works include ordinary people fighting against economic hardship, the conflict between duty and desire (a traditional Japanese theme; see giri), loyalty and group mentality versus freedom and individuality, personal isolation and estrangement, the rapid industrialization of Japan and its social consequences, contempt of Japan's aping of Western culture, and a pessimistic view of human nature. Sōseki took a strong interest in the writers of the Shirakaba (White Birch) literary group. In his final years, authors such as Akutagawa Ryūnosuke and Kume Masao became close followers of his literary style as his disciples.

Legacy

In the 21st century, there has been a global emergence of interest in Sōseki. Sōseki's Kokoro has been newly published in 10 languages, such as Arabic, Slovenian and Dutch, since 2001. Kokoro also holds the distinction as the best-selling bunkobon in Japan, having sold over seven million copies in the country as of 2016.

In South Korea, the complete collection of Sōseki's long works began to be published in 2013. In English-speaking countries there has been a succession of English translations since 2008. About 60 of his works have been translated into more than 30 languages. Reasons for this emergence of global interest have been attributed in part to Haruki Murakami who said Sōseki was his favorite Japanese writer. Political scientist Kang Sang-jung, who is the principal of Seigakuin University, said, "Soseki predicted the problems we are facing today. He had a long-term view of civilization." He also said, "His popularity will become more global in the future".

In 2016, the centennial of Sōseki's death, Nishogakusha University in Tokyo collaborated with Hiroshi Ishiguro, robotics researcher at Osaka University, to create a robotic android version of Sōseki. Sōseki's grandson, Fusanosuke Natsume, voiced the 130 cm figure which depicted Sōseki at age 45. The robot gave lectures and recitations of Sōseki's works at the university, as a way to engage students' interest in literature.

In 2017, as part of the 150-year commemoration of Sōseki's birth, the Asahi Beer Oyamazaki Villa Museum of Art displayed the letter Sōseki had written suggesting names for the villa itself. Sōseki had been on good terms with the owner, Shotaro Kaga, who asked him to name the house. Sōseki died before its completion in 1917. Sōseki's diary was also on display during the exhibition. In June 2019, retired professor Ikuo Tsunematsu reopened the Sōseki Museum, in Surrey, dedicated to the writer's life in the United Kingdom. The museum originally opened in 1982 in London, but closed in 2016 due to high maintenance costs and a decreased rate of attendance. The collection includes over 10,000 items including works in translation, collected books and magazines from Sōseki's stay in London, and census records.

Sōseki appears as a character in The Great Ace Attorney: Adventures, where he is charged with stabbing a woman in the back during his stay in London, and defended by the protagonist. In the game, he has a pet cat called Wagahai, a reference to I Am a Cat. He also appears in the sequel, The Great Ace Attorney 2: Resolve, where he is further charged with a man's poisoning in London, as well as appearing as a witness to a murder that occurs in Japan. In the manga and anime Bungou Stray Dogs, a character is named and based around Sōseki. In homage to his novel of the same name, Sōseki's character uses the ability 'I Am a Cat' which allows him to transform into a calico cat.

Major works
Sōseki's major works include:

See also

 Anglo-Japanese relations
Fukuzawa Yukichi
 Fusanosuke Natsume – Sōseki's grandson
 Japanese community of London
 Japanese literature
 List of Japanese authors
 Minae Mizumura – finished Natsume's last, unfinished novel, Light and Darkness
Nakae Chōmin
Susumu Nishibe
Tsuneari Fukuda
Yamamoto Tsunetomo

References

Sources
 Bargen, Doris D. Suicidal Honor: General Nogi and the Writings of Mori Ogai and Natsume Sōseki. University of Hawaii Press (2006). 
 Brodey, I. S. and S. I. Tsunematsu, Rediscovering Natsume Sōseki, (Kent: Global Oriental, 2000)
 Doi, Takeo, trans. by W. J. Tyler, The Psychological World of Natsume Sōseki. Harvard University Asia Center (1976). 
 Gessel, Van C. Three Modern Novelists: Soseki, Tanizaki, Kawabata. Kodansha International, 1993
 
McClellan, Edwin: An Introduction to Sōseki. In: Harvard Journal of Asiatic Studies, Vol. 22 (Dec., 1959), pp. 150–208.
 Milward, Peter. The Heart of Natsume Sōseki: First Impressions of His Novels. Azuma Shobo (1981). ASIN: B000IK2690
 Olson, Lawrence. Ambivalent Moderns: Portraits of Japanese Cultural Identity. Savage, Maryland: Rowman & Littlefield (1992). 
 Ridgeway, William N. A Critical Study of The Novels of Natsume Sōseki, 1867–1916. Lewiston, New York: Edwin Mellen Press (January 28, 2005). 
 Yu, Beongchoeon. Natsume Sōseki. Macmillan Publishing Company (1984).

External links

 
  
 
Sōseki page including links to the entire text of Kokoro
Natsume Sōseki on aozora.gr.jp (complete texts with furigana)
Soseki Project  (resources for reading Sōseki's works in their original Japanese form)
 Natsume Soseki Memorial Museum
 Former Residence of Natsume Soseki (Kumamoto)
 Natsume Sōseki's grave
  https://www.hiroshiyamashita.com/
 Glenn Gould reads Natsume Soseki
 Natsume Soseki. Botchan. Chikuma Shobo (1986). 
 Natsume Soseki. Sanshiro. Chikuma Shobo (1986). 
 Natsume Soseki. Sorekara. Chikuma Shobo (1986). 
 Natsume Soseki. I Am a Cat (Parts I & II) (trans. Kan-ichi Ando, 1906)
 Natsume Soseki. I Am a Cat (Parts III & IV) (trans. Kan-ichi Ando, 1909)
 Natsume Soseki. Botchan (Master Darling) (trans. Yasotaro Morri, 1918)
 Natsume Soseki. Ten Nights' Dreams and Our Cat's Grave (trans. Sankichi Hata and Dofu Shirai)

 
1867 births
1916 deaths
People from Shinjuku
Writers from Tokyo
People of Meiji-period Japan
19th-century Japanese novelists
20th-century Japanese novelists
The Asahi Shimbun people
Japanese male short story writers
Japanese expatriates in the United Kingdom
University of Tokyo alumni
Alumni of University College London
Deaths from ulcers
19th-century Japanese poets
19th-century Japanese short story writers
20th-century Japanese short story writers
Japanese haiku poets
19th-century pseudonymous writers
20th-century pseudonymous writers